Tallabogue Creek is a stream in the U.S. state of Mississippi. It is a tributary to the Chickasawhay River.

Tallabogue is a name derived from the Choctaw language purported to mean "palmetto creek". Variant names are "Taala Bogue Creek", "Talla Bogue Creek", "Talla Creek", "Tallobogue Creek", and "Tallow Bogue Creek".

References

Rivers of Mississippi
Rivers of Clarke County, Mississippi
Mississippi placenames of Native American origin